Zwei Brüder (Two Brothers) is a German detective television series based on an idea by Felix Huby, who also wrote several screenplays. Eleven directors produced 17 episodes of 85-90 minute length for ZDF between 1994 and 2000. The music for the series was by Frank Langer and Wilbert Hirsch.

Plot
The two brothers, Christoph (Fritz Wepper) and Peter Thaler (Elmar Wepper) could not be more different: the elder Christoph is married and a successful attorney. The younger Peter has given up his studies and is considered by police as a ruthless detective. Both live in the house of the mother (Ruth Hausmeister) and so tensions are inevitable. Together, they go hunting criminals and solve difficult cases.

Episodes
The episodes are as follows:

1. Zwei Brüder
2. Die lange Nacht
3. Die Quirini-Affäre
4. Der Gassenmörder
5. In eigener Sache
6. Die Tochter
7. Nervenkrieg
8. Einzelgänger
9. Kaltes Herz
10. Tödliche Träume
11. Verschleppt
12. Gift
13. Herztod
14. Mörderische Rache
15. Tod im See
16. Farbe der Nacht
17. Abschied

Cast

 Klaus J. Behrendt
 Suzanne von Borsody
 Jacques Breuer
 Anne-Sophie Briest
 Sky du Mont
 Alexander Duda
 Anton Feichtner
 Peter Fricke
 Dirk Galuba
 Gerald A. Held
 Jörg Hube
 
 Oliver Korittke
 Henry van Lyck
 Axel Milberg
 Franka Potente
 Ralf Richter
 Barbara Rudnik
 Dietmar Schönherr
 Ellen Schwiers
 
 Dietz-Werner Steck
 Oliver Stritzel
 Friedrich von Thun
 Max Tidof
 Christian Tramitz
 Karl-Heinz Vosgerau
 Klaus Wennemann
 Rolf Zacher

See also
List of German television series

References

External links
 

German crime television series
1990s German police procedural television series
2000s German police procedural television series
1994 German television series debuts
2000 German television series endings
German-language television shows
ZDF original programming
Detective television series